Cornu de Jos may refer to several villages in Romania:

 Cornu de Jos, a village in Cornu Commune, Prahova County
 Cornu de Jos, a village in Drăgăneşti Commune, Prahova County